Oakland Activities Association is a Southeast Michigan high school athletics conference. It is made up of 23 schools located largely throughout Oakland County, with a single member located in Wayne County

History
The Oakland Activities Association was first formed with schools from an amalgamation of different leagues. The G.O.A.L. (Greater Oakland Activities League), Metro Suburban Activities Association and the Southeastern Michigan Association (plus one independently associated school) were all merged in 1994 into the Oakland Activities Association, with the goal being to form a more geographically-centered league.

Charter members

After its first year, the OAA experienced rapid growth, with Pontiac Central from the Saginaw Valley Association and Oak Park from the Suburban Athletic League joining in 1995, and Auburn Hills Avondale, Clawson, Madsion Heights Lamphere, and Madison Heights Madison all coming to the OAA in 1996 after the disbandment of the Macomb-Oakland Athletic Conference.

The next major growth period did not occur until 2002, when Farmington, North Farmington, and Farmington Hills Harrison from the Western Lakes Activities Association as well as the newly built Stoney Creek High School in Rochester Hills all joined the OAA. 

2002 also marked a period of decline for the OAA, beginning with Brandon High leaving to join the Flint Metro League that year, where it currently resides. Two years after that, in 2004, Madison and Lamphere left to join the Macomb Area Conference, while Clawson left to join the Metro Conference, and in 2008, Waterford Mott and Waterford Kettering left to join the Kensington Lakes Activities Association. However, in 2010, the OAA gained a new member in Oxford, who had come from the Flint Metro League. After that, the next school to leave the OAA for another conference did not come for another 11 years, when Hazel Park left to join the Macomb Area Conference in 2019. 

However, the OAA has been beginning to fill these holes in their membership, extending an invitation to Ferndale University in 2020, who had been co-oping with Ferndale for football for years, and extending another invitation to their first non-Oakland County school in Harper Woods, who was previously an independent, in 2021.

There have also been a significant amount of closings and consolidations of various Oakland County schools in recent years, which also has not helped the OAA's membership. These aforementioned consolidations are Dondero High School closing and merging with Kimball High School to create Royal Oak High School in 2006, Pontiac Central High School closing and merging with Pontiac Northern High School to create Pontiac High School in 2009, Lahser High School closing and merging with Andover High School to create Bloomfield Hills High School in 2013, Southfield-Lathrup High School closing and merging with Southfield High School to create Southfield Senior High School for the Arts and Technology (commonly abbreviated to Southfield A&T) in 2016, and Harrison High School closing in 2019.

Member schools

Current members

*- Ferndale University is involved in a co-op agreement with Ferndale for football

Former members

Membership timeline

OAA Divisions
The members of the Oakland Activities Association is divided into divisions which vary by sport. Before 2007, these divisions were labeled after Roman Numerals, with there typically being three divisions, labeled I, II, III, and occasionally a fourth, labeled IV. Nowadays, though, these divisions are labeled after colors, with most sports typically having three divisions: red, white, and blue. However, some sports are only divided into the red or white divisions while some are divided into a fourth division, gold.

OAA Football Divisional Champions
{| class="wikitable collapsible collapsed" width=400px
|-
! colspan=4 | Division I (1994-2006)/Red Division (2007-) Champions
|-
! Year !! School !! Division !! Overall
|-
|1994 ||Troy || align = "center"|5-0 || align = "center"|12-1
|-
|1995 ||Troy || align = "center"|5-0 || align = "center"|9-2
|-
|1996 ||Clarkston || align = "center"|6-0 || align = "center"|9-1
|-
|1997 ||Troy || align = "center"|6-0 || align = "center"|10-1
|-
|1998 ||Lake OrionRochester AdamsTroy || align = "center"|4-14-14-1 || align = "center"|10-29-29-2
|-
|1999 ||Clarkston || align = "center"|4-1 || align = "center"|11-2
|-
|2000 ||Clarkston || align = "center"|6-0 || align = "center"|12-1
|-
|2001 ||Rochester Adams || align = "center"|6-0|| align = "center"|10-1
|-
|2002 ||Farmington Hills HarrisonLake OrionRochester Adams || align = "center"|6-16-16-1 || align = "center"|8-39-28-2
|-
|2003 ||Farmington Hills Harrison || align = "center"|7-0 || align = "center"|11-2
|-
|2004 ||Rochester Adams || align = "center"|8-0 || align = "center"|12-1
|-
|2005 ||Rochester Adams || align = "center"|8-0 || align = "center"|12-1
|-
|2006 ||Lake Orion || align = "center"|8-0 || align = "center"|10-1
|-
|2007 ||Clarkston || align = "center"|8-0 || align = "center"|9-2
|-
|2008 ||Lake Orion || align = "center"|7-0 || align = "center"|12-2
|-
|2009 ||Clarkston || align = "center"|7-0 || align = "center"|12-1
|-
|2010 ||Lake Orion || align = "center"|7-0 || align = "center"|13-1
|-
|2011 ||ClarkstonLake Orion || align = "center"|6-16-1 || align = "center"|7-46-4
|-
|2012 ||Clarkston || align = "center"|7-0 || align = "center"|11-1
|-
|2013 ||Clarkston || align = "center"|7-0 || align = "center"|13-1
|-
|2014 ||Clarkston || align = "center"|7-0 || align = "center"|14-0
|-
|2015 ||West Bloomfield || align = "center"|7-0 || align = "center"|9-1
|-
|2016 ||ClarkstonSouthfield A&T || align = "center"|5-15-1 || align = "center"|9-38-4
|-
|2017 ||Rochester AdamsWest Bloomfield || align = "center"|6-16-1 || align = "center"|9-211-3
|-
|2018 ||Clarkston || align = "center"|5-1 || align = "center"|11-3
|-
|2019 ||West Bloomfield || align = "center"|6-0 || align = "center"|10-2
|-
|2020 ||Clarkston || align = "center"|5-0 || align = "center"|8-1
|}

{| class="wikitable collapsible collapsed" width=400px
|-
! colspan=4 | Division II (1994-2006)/White Division (2007-) Champions
|-
! Year !! School !! Division !! Overall
|-
|1994 ||Lake Orion || align = "center"|4-0 || align = "center"|7-3 
|-
|1995 ||Pontiac Central || align = "center"|5-0 || align = "center"|10-2
|-
|1996 ||Berkley || align = "center"|6-0 || align = "center"|8-2 
|-
|1997 ||Birmingham Seaholm || align = "center"|6-1 || align = "center"|10-2 
|-
|1998 ||Waterford Kettering || align = "center"|6-0 || align = "center"|7-2
|-
|1999 ||BerkleyWaterford Mott || align = "center"|5-15-1 || align = "center"|6-46-4
|-
|2000 ||Birmingham Groves || align = "center"|6-0 || align = "center"|8-2
|-
|2001 ||Royal Oak Kimball || align = "center"|6-0 || align = "center"|9-2 
|-
|2002 ||Birmingham Seaholm || align = "center"|6-1 || align = "center"|8-3
|-
|2003 ||Birmingham Groves || align = "center"|6-1 || align = "center"|7-4 
|-
|2004 ||Southfield || align = "center"|8-0 || align = "center"|9-1
|-
|2005 ||Birmingham Seaholm || align = "center"|7-1 || align = "center"|8-3
|-
|2006 ||Royal Oak || align = "center"|7-1|| align = "center"|8-3 
|-
|2007 ||Rochester Adams || align = "center"|7-0 || align = "center"|11-2
|-
|2008 ||Rochester Adams || align = "center"|7-0 || align = "center"|8-2
|-
|2009 ||Rochester Adams || align = "center"|7-0 || align = "center"|8-3
|-
|2010 ||Farmington Hills Harrison || align = "center"|7-0 || align = "center"|14-0
|-
|2011 ||Farmington Hills Harrison || align = "center"|7-0 || align = "center"|10-1
|-
|2012 ||Oak Park || align = "center"|6-1 || align = "center"|9-3
|-
|2013 ||Southfield || align = "center"|7-0 || align = "center"|7-3
|-
|2014 ||Farmington Hills HarrisonOak ParkSouthfield || align = "center"|6-16-16-1 || align = "center"|10-38-39-4
|-
|2015 ||Farmington Hills Harrison || align = "center"|7-0 || align = "center"|7-3
|-
|2016 ||Birmingham Groves || align = "center"|6-0 || align = "center"|11-2
|-
|2017 ||Birmingham GrovesFarmington Hills HarrisonOak Park || align = "center"|6-16-16-1 || align = "center"|7-310-49-3
|-
|2018 ||Oak Park || align = "center"|6-0 || align = "center"|9-2
|-
|2019 ||Oak Park || align = "center"|6-0 || align = "center"|8-2
|-
|2020 ||Stoney Creek || align = "center"|5-0 || align = "center"|7-1
|}

{| class="wikitable collapsible collapsed" width=400px
|-
! colspan=4 | Division III (1994-2006)/Blue Division (2007-) Champions
|-
! Year !! School !! Division !! Overall
|-
|1994 ||Royal Oak Kimball || align = "center"|4-0 || align = "center"|10-2
|-
|1995 ||Royal Oak Kimball || align = "center"|5-0 || align = "center"|10-1 
|-
|1996 ||Ferndale || align = "center"|6-0 || align = "center"|10-1
|-
|1997 ||Birmingham Groves || align = "center"|6-0 || align = "center"|8-3 
|-
|1998 ||Birmingham GrovesOrtonville BrandonPontiac Northern || align = "center"|5-15-15-1 || align = "center"|7-26-37-3 
|-
|1999 ||Pontiac Northern || align = "center"|6-0 || align = "center"|9-3
|-
|2000 ||Birmingham SeaholmOrtonville BrandonSouthfield  || align = "center"|5-15-15-1  || align = "center"|9-39-27-3
|-
|2001 ||Birmingham Seaholm|| align = "center"|6-0|| align = "center"|11-1
|-
|2002 ||FarmingtonNorth Farmington || align = "center"|5-15-1 || align = "center"|10-26-3 
|-
|2003 ||Farmington || align = "center"|6-0 || align = "center"|8-2
|-
|2004 ||Auburn Hills AvondaleBloomfield Hills AndoverBloomfield Hills Lahser || align = "center"|8-18-18-1 || align = "center"|8-210-29-2 
|-
|2005 ||Bloomfield Hills Lahser || align = "center"|9-0 || align = "center"|12-1 
|-
|2006 ||Rochester Hills Stoney Creek || align = "center"|8-0 || align = "center"|8-2 
|-
|2007 ||Rochester Hills Stoney CreekWaterford Mott || align = "center"|7-17-1 || align = "center"|8-27-3 
|-
|2008 ||Bloomfield Hills Lahser || align = "center"|8-0 || align = "center"|11-2 
|-
|2009 ||Hazel ParkPontiac || align = "center"|6-16-1 || align = "center"|8-37-3 
|-
|2010 ||Hazel Park || align = "center"|8-0 || align = "center"|8-2
|-
|2011 ||Birmingham GrovesNorth Farmington || align = "center"|6-26-2 || align = "center"|6-47-3 
|-
|2012 ||Birmingham Seaholm || align = "center"|8-0 || align = "center"|8-2 
|-
|2013 ||Birmingham Seaholm || align = "center"|7-0  || align = "center"|9-2
|-
|2014 ||Farmington || align = "center"|7-0 || align = "center"|7-3
|-
|2015 ||Birmingham Groves || align = "center"|7-0 || align = "center"|10-1
|-
|2016 ||Bloomfield Hills || align = "center"|6-0 || align = "center"|9-1
|-
|2017 ||Auburn Hills AvondaleFerndaleHazel Park || align = "center|5-15-15-1 || align = "center"|6-48-26-4
|-
|2018 ||Birmingham Seaholm || align = "center"|6-0 || align = "center"|7-3
|-
|2019 ||North Farmington || align = "center"|6-0 || align = "center"|9-1
|-
|2020 ||Rochester || align = "center"|6-0 || align = "center"|6-1
|}

{| class="wikitable collapsible collapsed" width=400px
|-
! colspan=4 | Division IV Champions
|-
! Year !! School !! Division !! Overall
|-
|1994 ||Birmingham Groves || align = "center"|4-0 || align = "center"|5-4
|-
|1995 ||Hazel Park  || align = "center"|5-0 || align = "center"|7-2 
|-
|1996 ||Ortonville Brandon  || align = "center"|6-0 || align = "center"|9-1 
|-
|1997 ||Ortonville Brandon  || align = "center"|6-0 || align = "center"|10-1 
|-
|1998 ||Oak Park  || align = "center"|7-0  || align = "center"|8-2
|-
|1999 ||Clawson  || align = "center"|6-1 || align = "center"|7-4
|-
|2000 ||Bloomfield Hills Andover  || align = "center"|6-0  || align = "center"|6-4
|-
|2001 ||Auburn Hills AvondaleBloomfield Hills Andover  || align = "center"|5-15-1  || align = "center"|5-47-3
|-
|2002 ||Bloomfield Hills Lahser  || align = "center"|7-0  || align = "center"|12-1 
|-
|2003 ||Bloomfield Hills Lahser  || align = "center"|7-0  || align = "center"|9-2
|}

References

External links 
 Oakland Activities Association Official Website 
 Oakland Activities Association at League Lineup
 MHSAA 2018-19 Enrollment https://www.mhsaa.com/portals/0/documents/AD%20Forms/1819enroll.pdf 
 Michigan High School Football

Michigan high school sports conferences